Mekegi (Dargwa: Микlхlе) is a rural locality (a selo) and the administrative centre of Mekeginsky Selsoviet, Levashinsky District, Republic of Dagestan, Russia. The population was 2,936 as of 2010. There are 76 streets.

Geography 
Mekegi is located 18 km southeast of Levashi (the district's administrative centre) by road. Tarlankak and Aylakab are the nearest rural localities.

Nationalities 
Dargins live there.

Famous residents 
 Gamid Gamidov (State Duma deputy)
 Gasan Umalatov (honored master of sports in universal combat)
 Magomedshapi Isayev (philologist, Doctor of Science; poet, Honored Scientist of the Republic of Dagestan)
 Suleyman Murtazaliyev (Chevalier of three Orders of Labor Glory)

References 

Rural localities in Levashinsky District